This is the complete list of the winners of the Los Angeles Film Critics Association Award for Best Director given by the Los Angeles Film Critics Association.

Winners

1970s

1980s

1990s

2000s

2010s

2020s

References

D
Awards for best director